The 2011 Southern District Council election was held on 6 November 2011 to elect all 17 elected members to the 20-member District Council.

Overall election results
Before election:

Change in composition:

References

2011 Hong Kong local elections